Gonzalo Miceli (born 18 September 1997) is an Argentine professional footballer who plays as a midfielder for Brown de Adrogué.

Career
Miceli was promoted into the senior side of Primera B Nacional team Nueva Chicago in 2017–18, initially being a substitute for matches against Deportivo Morón, Quilmes and Gimnasia y Esgrima. Juan José Serrizuela was the manager who selected Miceli for his professional debut on 18 March 2018 against Instituto, which was followed by three more appearances in his debut campaign.

Career statistics
.

References

External links

1997 births
Living people
Place of birth missing (living people)
Argentine people of Italian descent
Argentine footballers
Association football midfielders
Primera Nacional players
Nueva Chicago footballers
Club Atlético Banfield footballers
Club Atlético Brown footballers